The Javari-Buriti Area of Relevant Ecological Interest is an area of relevant ecological interest in the state of Amazonas, Brazil.

Location

The Javari-Buriti Area of Relevant Ecological Interest (ARIE) is in the municipality of Santo Antônio do Içá, Amazonas.
It is bonded to the east by the Jutaí-Solimões Ecological Station and to the north by the Solimões River. The western boundary is a few kilometers east of a channel of the Solimões.
It is bounded to the south by the eastern portion of the Betânia Indigenous Territory, which overlaps with the Jutaí-Solimões Ecological Station.

History

The Javari-Buriti Area of Relevant Ecological Interest was created by federal decree 91.886 of 5 November 1985.
The purpose was to protect an area of Buriti palm forests and associated fauna.
It is classed as IUCN protected area category IV (habitat/species management area) with the objective of maintaining natural ecosystems of regional or local importance and regulating use to make it compatible with conservation of nature.
It became part of the Central Amazon Ecological Corridor, created in 2002.
The ARIE is administered by the federal Chico Mendes Institute for Biodiversity Conservation.

Notes

Sources

Areas of relevant ecological interest of Brazil
Protected areas of Amazonas (Brazilian state)
1985 establishments in Brazil